Elections were held in the Australian state of Queensland on 27 April 1912 to elect the 72 members of the state's Legislative Assembly.

The election was the first for the recently formed Liberal government of Digby Denham, who had been premier since 7 February 1911. The opposition Labor Party was led by David Bowman, who had been Labor leader since 15 April 1907.

Results

Denham and his government were returned to office despite a swing to Labor of almost 10 percent.  This was largely due to winning newly created seats in rural areas, while losing seats in Brisbane which mostly went to Labor.

|}

See also
 Members of the Queensland Legislative Assembly, 1909–1912
 Members of the Queensland Legislative Assembly, 1912–1915
 Denham Ministry

References

Elections in Queensland
1912 elections in Australia
1910s in Queensland
April 1912 events